Rosa Vera is a paralympic athlete from Mexico competing mainly in category TW4 Track events.

Biography
Rosa Vera took part in the 1992 Summer Paralympics 100m, 200m, 400m and 800m but it was as part of the Mexican 4 × 100 m relay team that she won a bronze medal.

References

External links
 

Year of birth missing (living people)
Living people
Paralympic athletes of Mexico
Paralympic bronze medalists for Mexico
Paralympic medalists in athletics (track and field)
Athletes (track and field) at the 1992 Summer Paralympics
Medalists at the 1992 Summer Paralympics
Mexican female wheelchair racers